Joseph Morvan (Moustoir-Ac, 3 December 1924 – Colpo, 26 July 1999) was a French professional road bicycle racer. Morvan had his most successful year in 1956, when he won Paris–Bourges and stage in the Tour de France.

Major results

1949
Manche-Océan
1951
Manche-Océan
Quimper
1955
Manche-Océan
Comfort-Meillant
1956
Le Bono
Paris–Bourges
Plonéour-Lavern
Pontivy
Vitré
Tour de France:
Winner stage 5
Manche-Océan
1957
Etoile du Léon
Trédion
Manche-Océan
1958
Aubusson
Languidic
Pont-l'Abbé
Manche-Océan
1960
Hennebont
Circuit du Cher
1961
Châteaulin
Boucles de l'Aulne

External links 

Official Tour de France results for Joseph Morvan

1924 births
1999 deaths
Sportspeople from Morbihan
French male cyclists
French Tour de France stage winners
Cyclists from Brittany